Makalaka is a general designation used by the Bechuana, Matabele and kindred peoples, for conquered or slave tribes.  Thus, many of the tribes subjugated by the Makololo chief, Sebetwane (or Sebituane, or Setitwane) in about 1830 were called Makalaka.  The name is more frequently used to designate the Makalanga, one of the tribes mistakenly classed as Mashonas, who were brought into subjection by the Matabele.

Notable people
 

Uwini, a Makalaka leader

References

 David Livingstone Missionary Travels and Researches in South Africa, London, 1857

Slavery in Africa
History of Africa